Geraldo Holanda Cavalcanti is a Brazilian lawyer and diplomat. He was born in Recife, on February 6, 1929. He attended high school at Colégio Nóbrega. He studied law in Recife, graduating in 1951. He interned at the Academy of International Law in The Hague.

He entered the diplomatic service, by direct competition, in 1954. He served in Washington, Geneva, Moscow, New York, Hong Kong and Bonn. In 1974, he was invited by Antonio Francisco Azeredo da Silveira to join his Cabinet. In 1978, he was appointed Ambassador to UNESCO. During his tenure, Ouro Preto and Olinda were added to the in the list of World Heritage Sites. He was Ambassador to Mexico (1982-1986) and Ambassador to the EC in Brussels (1986-1990). He took early retirement in 1991.

He is the sixth occupant of Chair No. 29 at the Academia Brasileira. He was elected on June 2, 2010, in succession to José Mindlin, and he was received on October 18, 2010, by Eduardo Portella. In December 2010, he was elected Treasurer and in 2011 General Secretary of the Academy. In 2013 he was elected Correspondent Member of the Lisbon Science Academy. He chaired the Brazilian Academy of Letters in 2014 and 2015.

References

Brazilian diplomats
1929 births
Living people
People from Recife